Earlville is an unincorporated community on the border of Amity and Earl townships in Berks County, Pennsylvania, United States. Earlville is located along Pennsylvania Route 562 at the crossing of Manatawny Creek, west of Boyertown.

References

Unincorporated communities in Berks County, Pennsylvania
Unincorporated communities in Pennsylvania